Saiza Nabarawi,() also spelt as Siza Nabrawi or Ceza Nabarawi, (born Zainab Mohamed Mourad Nabarawi), (1897–1985) was an Egyptian journalist educated in Paris, and who eventually became the leading journalist for the L'Egyptienne magazine.

Early life
Saiza Nabarawi or Siza Nabrawi was originally born as Zainab Mohamed Mourad Nabrawi, into a family from Nabaruh in Egypt's Dakahlia governorate, and is a relative of the prominent Egyptian doctor Ibrahim Nabarawi.
She was adopted by Adila Nabarawi, a distant relative, and was taken to Paris to be educated.

She attended a convent school in Versailles and eventually studied at the Saint Germain des Pres Institute in Paris. She was sent back to Egypt but continued her education in a French school, Les Dames de Sion School in Alexandria. When her foster mother committed suicide, Nabarawi was claimed by Muhammad Murad and Fatma Hanim, her biological parents. She rejected them and lived with her maternal grandparents instead. Huda Shaarawi, a friend of her foster mother, eventually took an interest in Nabarawi during her early teens and helped her become a strong willed women's activist.

Later life
A major act of defiance in Saiza Nabarawi's  or Siza Nabrawi's life occurred when she struggled against veils  and headscarves which were imposed on many women. In 1923, on her return from the Conference of the International Women Suffrage Alliance in Rome, she and Sha'rawi removed their veils  and headscarves at a public train station.

She also wrote about her exclusion from the third convocation of parliament in March 1925 in her article 'Double Standard'. In her piece she notes how she was not allowed admission into a parliament regarding Egypt's independence. She points out how wives of important officials were included in the audience, and not an editor of a successful newspaper. Her witty sarcasm and candor words made Nabarawi and excellent editor and feminist.

Career

Egyptian Feminist Union
Nabarawi and Shaarawi were the founders of the Egyptian Feminist Union which called for the political rights for Egyptian women. It published the L'Egyptienne, the magazine of the EPU, which Nabarawi edited. She also founded the Women's Popular Resistance Committee. Nabarawi dedicated her life to feminist activism and attended international feminist conferences and spoke widely on the issues of gender equality.

She called for the need to arrange the First Eastern Women's Congress, a call answered by Nour Hamada, who arranged it in Damaskus in 1930.

One of Nabarawi's mentors, Sa’d Zaghlul, regarded the fashioning of the veil in a way that was unorthodox to actual veiling. It was used more like a scarf designed to only cover the face. Her opinions describe the evolution from veil to no veil that Nabarawi took part in.

References

1897 births
1985 deaths
Writers from Cairo
Egyptian journalists
Egyptian feminists
Egyptian revolutionaries
Egyptian women writers
20th-century journalists
Egyptian expatriates in France